Ludwigshafen/Frankenthal is an electoral constituency (German: Wahlkreis) represented in the Bundestag. It elects one member via first-past-the-post voting. Under the current constituency numbering system, it is designated as constituency 207. It is located in southeastern Rhineland-Palatinate, comprising the cities of Ludwigshafen and Frankenthal and the northern part of the Rhein-Pfalz-Kreis district.

Ludwigshafen/Frankenthal was created for the inaugural 1949 federal election. Since 2017, it has been represented by Christian Schreider of the Social Democratic Party (SPD).

Geography
Ludwigshafen/Frankenthal is located in southeastern Rhineland-Palatinate. As of the 2021 federal election, it comprises the independent cities of Ludwigshafen and Frankenthal and the municipalities of Bobenheim-Roxheim, Böhl-Iggelheim, Limburgerhof, Mutterstadt, Altrip, and Neuhofen and the Verbandsgemeinden of Dannstadt-Schauernheim, Lambsheim-Heßheim, and Maxdorf from the Rhein-Pfalz-Kreis district.

History
Ludwigshafen/Frankenthal was created in 1949, then known as Ludwigshafen am Rhein. From 1965 through 1998, it was named Ludwigshafen. It acquired its current name in the 2002 election. In the 1949 election, it was Rhineland-Palatinate constituency 11 in the numbering system. In the 1953 through 1961 elections, it was number 158. In the 1965 through 1976 elections, it was number 159. In the 1980 through 1998 elections, it was number 157. In the 2002 election, it was number 210. In the 2005 election, it was number 209. In the 2009 and 2013 elections, it was number 208. Since the 2017 election, it has been number 207.

Originally, the constituency comprised the cities of Ludwigshafen and Frankenthal, the district of Landkreis Ludwigshafen, and the district of Landkreis Frankenthal excluding the Amtsgerichtsbezirk of Grünstadt. In the 1965 and 1969 elections, it comprised the city of Ludwigshafen and the Landkreis Ludwigshafen district. In the 1972 through 1998 elections, it comprised the city of Ludwigshafen and the municipalities of Altrip, Böhl-Iggelheim, Limburgerhof, Mutterstadt, and Neuhofen and Verbandsgemeinde of Dannstadt-Schauernheim from the Landkreis Ludwigshafen district. It acquired its current borders in the 2002 election.

Members
The constituency was first represented by Friedrich Wilhelm Wagner of the Social Democratic Party (SPD) from 1949 to 1965. Hans Bardens of the SPD served from 1965 to 1983. Manfred Reimann of the SPD was then representative from 1983 to 1990. The constituency was won by then-Chancellor of Germany Helmut Kohl of the Christian Democratic Union (CDU) in 1990. He was re-elected in 1994. Doris Barnett of the SPD was elected in 1998 and served until 2009. Maria Böhmer won it for the CDU in 2009 and served two terms. Torbjörn Kartes of the CDU was elected in 2017. Christian Schreider was elected for the SPD in 2021.

Election results

2021 election

2017 election

2013 election

2009 election

References

Federal electoral districts in Rhineland-Palatinate
1949 establishments in West Germany
Constituencies established in 1949
Ludwigshafen
Frankenthal
Rhein-Pfalz-Kreis